The Shasta language is an extinct Shastan language formerly spoken from northern California into southwestern Oregon. It was spoken in a number of dialects, possibly including Okwanuchu. By 1980, only two first language speakers, both elderly, were alive. Today, all ethnic Shasta people speak English as their first language. According to Golla, there were four distinct dialects of Shasta:

 Ikirakácˑu (Oregon Shasta)
 Iruhikwáˑcˑu (Klamath River Shasta)
 Uwáˑtuhúcˑu (Scott Valley Shasta)
 Ahútˑireˀeˑcˑu (Shasta Valley Shasta)

Phonology

Consonants

The length of a consonant distinguishes meaning in Shasta words. All stops, fricatives and nasals can occur as long or short in Shasta, but approximants /r j w/ only occur as short consonants. Minimal pairs and near minimal pairs are shown below:

 /t͡ʃákàráx/ a gnat vs. /t͡sàkːírʔ/ a board
 /ʔátʼùʔ/ nothing vs. /ʔátʼːùʔ/ wild sunflower
 /ʔìsíkʼːàʔ/ a person vs. /ʔìsːíkʼ/ cold

Vowels
Shasta has four vowels, with contrastive length, and two tones: high and low.

Orthography 
Silver (1966) devised a system to write words in Shasta. Long phonemes are represented with the symbol ⟨ˑ⟩ following the character (e.g. ⟨cˑ⟩ and ⟨eˑ⟩ for/ t͡sː/ and /eː/, respectively); ejectives are indicated by an apostrophe written over the character (e.g. ⟨p̓⟩ for /pʼ/). The letters ⟨b d f g j l q v z⟩ are not used to represent Shasta sounds.

Tones 
Shasta vowels can have low or high tones. High tones are marked by an acute accent ⟨′⟩ in the orthography devised by Silver (1966), whereas low tones are left unmarked. Examples for the vowel /u/ are given below:

References

Bibliography
Golla, Victor (2011), California Indian languages, Berkeley: University of California Press

External links
 Shasta language overview at the Survey of California and Other Indian Languages
 Shasta basic lexicon at the Global Lexicostatistical Database
 OLAC resources in and about the Shasta language

Shastan languages
Extinct languages of North America
Indigenous languages of California
Indigenous languages of Oregon